Players is a 2020 Burmese comedy-drama film starring Myint Myat, Htun Htun, Tyron Bejay, Khin Hlaing, Soe Myat Thuzar, Ei Chaw Po, May Mi Ko Ko and Hsaung Wutyee May. The film, produced by Bo Bo Film Production premiered in Myanmar on February 6, 2020.

Cast
Myint Myat as Min Htun
Ei Chaw Po as May Thu Kyaw
May Mi Ko Ko as Myat Sandi Oo
Khin Hlaing as Kyaw Zin
Htun Htun as Arkar
Soe Myat Thuzar as San San Tin
Aye Chan Maung as Zin Ko
Joker as Kyaw Zay Yar Toe Khine Lin
Hsaung Wutyee May as May Tharaphi Kyaw
Tyron Bejay as Willian

References

2020 films
2020 comedy-drama films
2020s Burmese-language films
Burmese comedy-drama films
Films shot in Myanmar